Pinecroft is an unincorporated community in Placer County, California. It lies at an elevation of 2047 feet (624 m).

References

Unincorporated communities in Placer County, California
Colfax, California
Unincorporated communities in California